Montess Ivette Enjema (born July 20, 1991) better known by her stage name Montess, is a Cameroonian singer, dancer and songwriter. She began her career at the age of 6 as a ballerina at the Government Primary School Buea Town. She later developed into dancing where she was awarded best dancer in the Buea community during the inter schools 11 February competitions. She gained prominence in 2015 after releasing "Love Witta Gun Man", a song that got her an Afrima award for Best Female artiste in Central Africa in 2017.

Career 
Montess start off as a dancer in high school. She later moved to acting and ended up being a singer. She began her musical career as lead singer of the University of Buea Orchestra

Discography

Selected singles 

 "DJ Play Ma Song" (featuring Stanley Enow) (2016)
 "Love Witta Gun Man" (2016)
 "Prends Mon Coeur" (2018)
 "Bring It 2nite" (2018)
 "Passe Partout" (featuring Mr Leo) (2019)
 "Allez Allez" (featuring Ko-c) (2019)
 "Small Girl Big God" (2021)

Awards and nominations

References

External links 

 Facebook.com "@IAmMontess on Facebook"
 Instagram.com "@i_am_montess on Instagram"
 Twitter.com "@I_AM_MONTESS on Twitter"

Living people
1991 births
People from Buea
Cameroonian actresses
Cameroonian film directors